Matthijs Bastiaan van Schelven (born 3 April 1989) is a Dutch cricketer. He made his List A cricket debut in the 2015 ICC World Cricket League Division Two tournament for the Netherlands against Kenya on 21 January 2015. He made his Twenty20 International debut for the Netherlands against Nepal on 1 July 2015.

References

External links
 

1989 births
Living people
Dutch cricketers
Netherlands Twenty20 International cricketers
Sportspeople from The Hague